The West Asian Football Federation Women's Championship, or simply WAFF Women's Championship, is an international women's association football competition contested by the senior women's national teams of the members of the West Asian Football Federation (WAFF), the governing body of football in Western Asia.

The championship has been held, on average, every two to three years. The first edition was contested in 2005, with hosts Jordan winning the competition. Jordan are also the current champions, having won the 2022 edition, and are the most successful team with five titles.

Results

 a.e.t.: after extra time
 pen.: after penalty shoot-out
 TBD: to be determined
 Notes

Teams reaching the top four

* = hosts

Records and statistics

All-time table

Under-age tournaments

Under-18

 a.e.t.: after extra time
 pen.: after penalty shoot-out
 TBD: to be determined
 Notes

* = hosts

Under-16

 a.e.t.: after extra time
 pen.: after penalty shoot-out
 TBD: to be determined
 Notes

* = hosts

Under-14

* = hosts

See also 
WAFF Championship
AFF Women's Championship
CAFA Women's Championship
EAFF E-1 Football Championship (women)
SAFF Women's Championship
AFC Women's Asian Cup

External links

WAFF Women's Championship at RSSSF

 
International association football competitions in Asia
International association football competitions in the Middle East
Women's association football competitions in Asia